Ritsuko Matsuda (Matsuda Ritsuko, 松田律子) is the birth name of LINA, a J-pop singer from Okinawa, Japan, and a member of the group Super Monkey's from 1995. After the group disbanded, she formed the group MAX with other Super Monkey's vocalists.

See also 
 Super Monkey's
 MAX

References 

1977 births
Living people
People from Okinawa Prefecture
Musicians from Okinawa Prefecture
21st-century Japanese singers
21st-century Japanese women singers